Kameničná (Hungarian pronunciation:) is a village and municipality in the Komárno District in the Nitra Region of southwest Slovakia.

Geography
The village lies on the Váh River, at an altitude of 110 metres and covers an area of 34.512 km².
It has a population of about 1830 people.

History
In the 9th century, the territory of Kameničná became part of the Kingdom of Hungary. In historical records the village was first mentioned in 1482.
After the Austro-Hungarian army disintegrated in November 1918, Czechoslovak troops occupied the area, later acknowledged internationally by the Treaty of Trianon. Between 1938 and 1945 Kameničná once more  became part of Miklós Horthy's Hungary through the First Vienna Award. From 1945 until the Velvet Divorce, it was part of Czechoslovakia. Since then it has been part of Slovakia.

Ethnicity
The village is about 79% Hungarian, 20% Slovak, and 1% Czech.

Facilities
The village has a public library, a cinema, and a football pitch.

Genealogical resources

The records for genealogical research are available at the state archive "Statny Archiv in Nitra, Slovakia"

 Roman Catholic church records (births/marriages/deaths): 1763-1939 (parish A)
 Reformated church records (births/marriages/deaths): 1828-1900 (parish B)

See also
 List of municipalities and towns in Slovakia

References

External links
http://www.kamenicna.sk
Surnames of living people in Kamenicna

Villages and municipalities in the Komárno District
Hungarian communities in Slovakia